Sir Richard Ford (1758 – 3 May 1806) was an English politician who sat in the house of Commons from 1789 to 1791.

Ford was elected as a Member of Parliament (MP) for the borough of East Grinstead in Sussex at an unopposed by-election in February 1789. He held that seat until the general election in 1790, when he was returned unopposed for the borough of Appleby in Westmorland.

He served less than a year as an MP for Appleby, until he resigned from the Commons in early 1791 by accepting the post of Steward of East Hendred. (The by-election for his successor was held in May 1791).

After serving the Undersecretary of State in the home office, Richard Ford was for many years chief police magistrate of London, for which services he was knighted. Ford lived some years with actress Dorothea Jordan, who had three children by him, one of whom died. She left him when his promises of marriage were not fulfilled, because it went against the wishes of Ford's father. Ford later married Benjamin Booth's daughter and a heiress. His eldest son from this marriage was also named Richard Ford known for his travel writings about Spain and art collection.

References 

1758 births
1806 deaths
Members of the Parliament of Great Britain for English constituencies
British MPs 1784–1790
British MPs 1790–1796
People from East Grinstead